Wild sage is a common name for several plants and may refer to:

Lantana camara – Spanish flag
 Salvia, a genus of plants commonly called "sage"
Salvia nemorosa – woodland sage
Salvia urticifolia – nettleleaf sage
Salvia verbenaca – clary sage
 Artemisia, a genus of plants including some called "sage" or "sagebrush"